Richard James Sheppard (14 February 1945 – 18 October 1998) was an English professional footballer who played as a goalkeeper in The Football League for West Bromwich Albion, Bristol Rovers, and Torquay United.

Sheppard represented Gloucester Schools as a child, before being signed by West Brom as an apprentice in 1960. He joined the professional ranks at the club in 1963 and went on to play 39 League games in six years with The Baggies. He moved back to his home city of Bristol in 1969 to join Bristol Rovers, and made 150 League appearances before suffering a skull fracture in January 1973 in a match against Tranmere Rovers at Eastville Stadium.

It was eleven months before he was to play again, when he joined Torquay United on loan in December 1973 in a deal that was set up in a roadside meeting between Rovers and Torquay near Bridgwater. He played just two games for Torquay, and it was a further year before he finally made it back into the Bristol Rovers lineup. His only appearance for The Pirates after breaking his skull came against Bristol City in December 1974, and after conceding four goals in the second half his professional career came to an abrupt end. Although he was sent out on loan to Fulham later in the season he never played in the Football League again.

In the summer of 1975, Sheppard joined non-League side Weymouth, where he spent a year, followed by a further year back in Bristol with Portway Bristol. He moved to Paulton Rovers in 1977, and in January 1980 became the goalkeeping coach for his former club Bristol Rovers. He died in 1998 at the age of 53.

Sources

1945 births
1998 deaths
Footballers from Bristol
English footballers
Association football goalkeepers
West Bromwich Albion F.C. players
Bristol Rovers F.C. players
Torquay United F.C. players
Fulham F.C. players
Weymouth F.C. players
Portway Bristol F.C. players
Paulton Rovers F.C. players
English Football League players